The Hudson Bay station is a railway station in Hudson Bay, Saskatchewan, Canada. It is a flag stop for Via Rail's Winnipeg–Churchill train.

Footnotes

External links 
Via Rail Station Information

Via Rail stations in Saskatchewan